Citytv (sometimes shortened to City, which was the network's official branding from 2012 to 2018) is a Canadian television network owned by the Rogers Sports & Media subsidiary of Rogers Communications. The network consists of six owned-and-operated (O&O) television stations located in the metropolitan areas of Toronto, Montreal, Winnipeg, Calgary, Edmonton, and Vancouver, a cable-only service that serves the province of Saskatchewan, and three independently owned affiliates serving smaller cities in Alberta and British Columbia.

The Citytv brand name originates from its flagship station, CITY-TV in Toronto, a station that went on the air in September 28, 1972 in the former Electric Circus nightclub in which became known for an intensely local format based on newscasts aimed at younger viewers, nightly movies, and music and cultural programming. The Citytv brand first expanded with then-parent company CHUM Limited's acquisition of former Global owned-and-operated station CKVU-TV in Vancouver, followed by its purchase of Craig Media's stations and the re-branding of its A-Channel system in Central Canada as Citytv in August 2005. CHUM Limited was acquired by CTVglobemedia (now Bell Media) in 2007; to comply with Canadian Radio-television and Telecommunications Commission (CRTC) ownership limits, the Citytv stations were sold to Rogers. The network grew through further affiliations with three Jim Pattison Group-owned stations, along with Rogers' acquisition of the cable-only Saskatchewan Communications Network and Montreal's CJNT-DT.

While patterned after the original station in Toronto, since the 2000s, and particularly since its acquisition by Rogers, Citytv has moved towards a series-based prime time schedule much like its competitors, albeit one still focused on younger demographics.

History

The licence of the original Citytv station, granted the callsign of CITY-TV by the CRTC, was awarded in Toronto on November 25, 1971, and began broadcasting for the first time using the "Citytv" brand on September 28, 1972, under the ownership of Channel Seventy-Nine Ltd. with its studios located at 99 Queen Street East near Church Street. The station was in debt by 1975. Multiple Access Ltd. (then-owners of CFCF-TV in Montreal) purchased a 45% interest in the station, and sold its stake to CHUM Limited three years later. CHUM Limited acquired the station outright in 1981. Broadcasting on UHF channel 79 during its first decade, the station moved to channel 57 in 1983, until moving to channel 44 with the digital transition (though mapping as virtual channel 57.1). In 1987, the station moved its headquarters to 299 Queen Street West, formerly known as the Ryerson Press Building (then known as the CHUM-City Building); one of the most recognizable landmarks in the city.

Citytv gained a second station in Vancouver when CHUM bought CKVU-TV from Canwest Global Communications in 2001. The station became known as "Citytv Vancouver" on July 22, 2002. Prior to CHUM's acquisition of CKVU, some Citytv programming was syndicated to KVOS-TV in nearby Bellingham, Washington.

In 2004, CHUM bought Craig Media, parent of the A-Channel system in Manitoba and Alberta. The Craig-owned A-Channel stations were relaunched as Citytv on August 2, 2005; the same date that CHUM's NewNet stations, including CKVR-TV, CHWI-TV and CFPL-TV, were rebranded under the A-Channel banner.

CHUM Limited announced plans to sell its broadcasting assets to CTV parent CTVglobemedia on July 12, 2006. CTVgm intended to retain CHUM's Citytv system while divesting CHUM's A-Channel stations and Alberta cable channel Access to get the CRTC to approve the acquisition. On the same day that the takeover was announced, Citytv cancelled its supper-hour, late-night and weekend newscasts at its local Vancouver, Edmonton, Calgary & Winnipeg stations, laying off hundreds of news department staff.

In October 2006, Citytv launched a daily national newscast, CityNews International, which was produced in Toronto for broadcast on the western Canadian stations and on CHUM's Toronto news channel CP24. The Edmonton and Calgary stations also began broadcasting a daily 30-minute magazine show, Your City, instead of a full-fledged newscast. The Vancouver news operation, which had operated for 30 years under various owners and station identities, was not maintained aside from Breakfast Television. In the same month, Citytv Toronto became the first television station in Canada to begin broadcasting its local newscasts in high definition.

The following year on June 8, the CRTC approved the CTV takeover of CHUM. However, the CRTC made the deal conditional on CTV divesting itself of Citytv, because there were already CTV owned-and-operated stations serving the same cities (CFTO-TV Toronto, CIVT-TV Vancouver, CFCN-TV Calgary, CFRN-TV Edmonton, and CKY-TV Winnipeg). Without the divestment, CTV would have exceeded the CRTC's concentration of media ownership limits. CTV announced on June 11, 2007, that it would retain the A-Channel stations, and sell the Citytv stations to Rogers Communications for $375 million. The transaction was approved by the CRTC on September 28 and was completed on October 31, 2007. On September 8, 2009, CITY Toronto moved to its current location at Yonge-Dundas Square at 33 Dundas Street East.

On December 6, 2010, CityNews Tonight Toronto anchor and continuity announcer Mark Dailey died after a long battle with cancer. The Citytv system began to phase in a modified branding in October 2012, with a new logo consisting only of the name "City", and some promotions using the verbal branding "City Television" (later also switched to simply "City") instead of "Citytv". The change marked the first major alteration to the "Citytv" brand since its introduction in 1972. The network adopted the name "City" on December 31, 2012 during its New Year's Eve special. For the 2018-19 television season, the network reintroduced its original "Citytv" branding, and its social media accounts.

Expanding into a national footprint
The Jim Pattison Group announced in July 2009 that its three television stations in western Canada (CKPG-TV, CFJC-TV, and CHAT-TV), formerly affiliated with E!, would join Citytv starting on September 1, 2009. These stations do not carry the Citytv branding; instead, the stations continue to use the same branding and logos they used as affiliates of the E! system. The Pattison-owned Citytv affiliates produce local newscasts, but do not produce their own versions of Breakfast Television nor title their midday and evening newscasts under the CityNews brand like the Citytv owned-and-operated stations do. Through a long-term affiliation renewal agreement on May 3, 2012, the Pattison stations began to carry 90% of Citytv's primetime programming and the majority of its morning and daytime programming from the programming grid of CKVU-DT, including simulcasts of the Vancouver edition of Breakfast Television. Unlike CKVU, the Pattison stations continue to produce midday and evening local newscasts.

Meanwhile, on December 20, 2011, Bluepoint Investment Corporation announced an affiliation agreement with Rogers Communications to air Citytv programming on the Saskatchewan Communications Network (SCN) from 3 p.m.-6 a.m. CT daily, beginning on January 2, 2012. This program block followed the national program grid of Citytv and was known on-air as "Citytv on SCN". Shortly after, on January 17, 2012, Rogers announced its intent to acquire SCN from Bluepoint. The deal gave the Citytv system stations in all provinces west of Quebec and south of the federal territories of Northern Canada. The sale was approved in late June 2012 by the CRTC and Rogers relaunched SCN as Citytv Saskatchewan on July 1. Rogers plans to invest in the station's infrastructure, and also launch a high definition feed.

In Montreal, Rogers announced its intent to acquire multicultural station CJNT-DT from Toronto-based Channel Zero on May 3, 2012 and announced an affiliation agreement with the station, effective June 4, 2012. This gave Citytv stations in all provinces west of Atlantic Canada as well as the system's first television station located east of the Greater Toronto Area. On December 20, 2012, the CRTC approved the acquisition of CJNT and Rogers' request to convert the station from multicultural to a conventional English-language station. The station began carrying the full Citytv schedule on February 4, 2013, turning Citytv from a television system into a full-fledged network. Rogers will produce 15.5 hours of local programming a week for CJNT (including a local edition of Breakfast Television), and agreed to contribute funding and programming to a new independent multicultural station in Montreal.

Programming

Citytv is well known for its unconventional approach to news and local programming. There is no news desk (anchors read the news standing up, or on stools), and cameras are sometimes hand-held. Citytv also pioneered the concept of videojournalism, where reporters often carry their own camera report and videotape their own stories. Citytv calls its videojournalists "videographers", but unlike many stations in American television markets that try to conceal the fact that reporters are so-called "one-man bands", Citytv embraced the use of video journalism by highlighting the use of technology; Citytv videographers often carry a second home video camera to record images of them videotaping on the scene. The low-grade video is then incorporated into the story to show viewers how the story was recorded.

At one time, Citytv's Toronto flagship CITY-TV produced more local programs than any other television station in Canada, and more local programming than any other station in North America other than Boston's WCVB-TV. Citytv produced shows such as Speakers' Corner, CityLine and was the original home of FashionTelevision, SexTV and MediaTelevision. Many of these series were not exclusively focused on Toronto – FT, for instance, consisted largely of foreign runway footage – and are easily syndicated to other outlets. The latter three shows are now owned by CTVglobemedia as a result of its takeover of CHUM and subsequent divestiture of the Citytv stations.

CITY prominently broadcast feature films during primetime, in late night and on weekends as part of the Great Movies block; as Citytv transitioned to a primetime lineup consisting of mainly domestic and American series during the 2000s, Great Movies was scaled back, then replaced in 2008 by reruns, reality shows and infomercials.

The station attracted attention and controversy by airing The Baby Blue Movie, a softcore pornography film showcase on Friday nights after midnight. Although this programming block was discontinued in the 1980s, it was reinstated on CITY and CKVU throughout most of the 2000s, until its ownership change to Rogers Communications. This, along with the 'hide away' place on the UHF dial formed the basis of fictional station "CIVIC TV" (Channel 83, Cable 12) in David Cronenberg's Videodrome, which is set in Toronto.

Citytv was one of the first television stations in Canada to implement a diversity policy in hiring its on-air staff, actively seeking out people of colour, people with disabilities, and other minority groups to work as on-air journalists. Znaimer described the policy as wanting the station to "look like Toronto".

Beginning in 1983, Citytv began to produce a New Year's Eve special live from Nathan Phillips Square in Downtown Toronto. Most recently known as the City New Year's Eve Bash, the yearly concert special expanded to include a second event in Calgary, Alberta for its 2012–13 edition. In 2013–14, Citytv began simulcasting ABC's Dick Clark's New Year's Rockin' Eve instead of airing its own full special, though it continued to sponsor (and air some coverage of) the New Year's event in Toronto.

News

Citytv Toronto's CityNews, which used to be known as CityPulse, had developed a large following since its debut in 1977. Other stations around the world have imitated its format to varying degrees of success. However, Citytv itself was unsuccessful in expanding its audience to other Canadian markets, as evidenced by the eventual cancellation of the other stations' traditional newscasts. Flagship station CITY-DT, along with Jim Pattison Group-owned affiliates CFJC-TV, CKPG-TV and CHAT-TV are the only Citytv stations producing midday or evening newscasts. The Pattison stations use their individual callsigns, instead of branding under the Citytv name and do not use the CityNews title for their weekday newscasts. Four of City's five other owned-and-operated broadcast stations (CKVU-DT, CKAL-DT, CKEM-DT and CHMI-DT) only produce localized versions of the morning program franchise Breakfast Television. Citytv Saskatchewan, meanwhile, does not carry any local programming, and would be unable to broadcast Breakfast Television due to its mandate of airing educational programming in the morning and daytime hours.

Due to the ongoing structural problems facing the conventional television industry in Canada and the global economic crisis, Rogers Media announced cost-cutting measures at the Citytv stations on January 19, 2010, which included massive layoffs and the cancellation of the following newscasts:
 CityNews at Noon in Calgary, Edmonton and Toronto
 Lunch Television in Vancouver
 Your City in Calgary and Edmonton, which was an evening replacement for previous CityNews programming that was cancelled in 2006.
 The satirical news program The CityNews List in Vancouver
 CityOnline, CityNews at Five and all weekend news programming in Toronto (the latter two were restored in 2011)
 City's national and international newscast, CityNews International

CITY-DT used to operate CP24, a cable news channel covering the Greater Toronto Area. During CTVglobemedia's purchase of CHUM Limited, the company chose to retain CP24, and the channel was re-aligned with CFTO (CTV). As a replacement, Rogers received approval for, and launched, CityNews Channel in October 2011. The network was modelled on Rogers-owned radio station CFTR 680, and featured news, weather, traffic reports, and other content drawing from the resources of Rogers properties such as Maclean's and Sportsnet. On May 30, 2013, as part of budget cuts, Rogers announced that the network would be shut down.

Citytv continued to produce Breakfast Television for all markets, and 6:00 p.m. and late-night CityNews Tonight in Toronto only (the evening newscasts in Toronto excluded weekend broadcasts until March 2011; the 5 p.m. newscast, meanwhile, would return in September 2011). Sixty Citytv employees (including long-time Toronto news anchor Anne Mroczkowski) were laid off across Canada.

In 2015, Rogers cancelled the Winnipeg and Edmonton editions of Breakfast Television; in Winnipeg, it was replaced by a simulcast of the morning show from co-owned radio station CITI-FM, and the Edmonton edition was replaced by the spin-off Dinner Television, which focuses on local events and does not feature original news reporting.

On June 5, 2017, Rogers announced that it would expand the CityNews brand to its other O&O markets, reversing the 2008 discontinuance of conventional newscasts on City's stations outside of Toronto. The network was relaunched local evening newscasts (airing as one-hour broadcasts at 6:00 and 11:00 p.m.) on its owned-and-operated stations in Edmonton and Winnipeg on September 4, 2017, followed by the launch of evening newscasts on its O&Os in Calgary, Montreal, and Vancouver in the winter of early 2018.

Sports

National broadcasts
Sports broadcasts on the Citytv stations have been sparse over the years. Between 2005 and 2014, the predominant sports property on Citytv was coverage of the National Football League.

Craig Media (then-owners of the current Citytv stations in Winnipeg, Edmonton and Calgary) owned the rights to Monday Night Football in the early 2000s, and these rights moved to Citytv for MNFs final season on ABC in 2005, before being moved again to TSN in 2006. Following the sale to Rogers, CKVU carried Sunday afternoon "late window" (4:00/4:15 p.m. ET, 1:00/1:15 p.m. PT) games during the 2007 season (as did Omni Television station CJMT in Toronto). From the 2008 season through 2013, all Citytv stations carried Sunday late-window games. After rights to late games were acquired by CTV (who also airs early games), Sportsnet and Citytv maintained rights to Thursday Night Football and the afternoon American Thanksgiving games until the 2017 season, when these rights were acquired by TSN.

Under Rogers ownership, Citytv has aired occasional sports broadcasts as an overflow channel for co-owned Sportsnet, such as a 2014 FIFA World Cup qualification group-stage match between Canada and Panama on September 11, 2012, in simulcast with Sportsnet One. It has also broadcast supplementary coverage of two tennis events that were primarily broadcast by the Sportsnet channels: the 2012 Rogers Cup, and the 2012 Davis Cup World Group Play-off between Canada and South Africa.

On November 26, 2013, Rogers announced a 12-year, $5.2 billion deal to become the exclusive national rightsholder to the National Hockey League in the 2014–15 season. Beginning in October 2014, Citytv began to broadcast NHL games produced by Sportsnet as part of Hockey Night in Canada, and Rogers Hometown Hockey, a Sunday night game of the week hosted by Ron MacLean. Hometown Hockey moved from Citytv to Sportsnet for the 2015-16 season.

Local/regional broadcasts
In addition to NFL regular-season games, CITY also aired some Buffalo Bills preseason games (including those held at the Rogers Centre).
The Citytv stations in Alberta (while still branded "A-Channel") carried some regional NHL games during their first few years of operation. They occasionally carried regional broadcasts in the event of conflicts with other Sportsnet programming (Sportsnet West being the regional rightsholder to both the Edmonton Oilers and Calgary Flames) until December 2009. Similarly, CKVU Vancouver carried two regional Vancouver Canucks broadcasts during the 2009-10 season, again due to programming conflicts on Sportsnet Pacific. Sportsnet has since preferred the use of regional overflow feeds tied to the license of Sportsnet One for these purposes.
CITY-TV Toronto broadcast some regular-season basketball games during the inaugural season of the Toronto Raptors. 
On March 2, 2008, CITY-TV aired its first baseball game, a Toronto Blue Jays spring training game, against the Cincinnati Reds. The Blue Jays, like City, are owned by Rogers.
CKVU occasionally carried broadcasts of Major League Soccer's Vancouver Whitecaps FC as part of Sportsnet's regional broadcast deal with the team from 2010 to 2013.
CJNT occasionally carried overflow broadcasts of the Montreal Canadiens as part of Sportsnet's regional broadcast deal with the team from 2014 through 2017.
CKEM carried FC Edmonton games for a period.

Citytv stations

Individual stations are normally branded on-air as simply "Citytv" (from 2012 to 2018, the stations were referred to as "City"); the location may be added, for example "Citytv Toronto", if disambiguation is necessary. The list also mentions which stations had been owned by either CHUM Ltd. or Rogers, depending on affiliation.

Owned-and-operated stations

Prior to 1997, CHUM owned two television outlets in Atlantic Canada: the ATV system of CTV affiliates, and cable-only channel ASN. Many Citytv programs were aired on ASN during this period, effectively making ASN an unbranded Citytv O&O. Both ATV and ASN were acquired by Baton Broadcasting (now Bell Media) in 1997; ASN continued to air much of the Citytv schedule until it became part of the A (now CTV 2) television system in 2008. This means that Atlantic Canada is now the largest gap in City's local coverage area, and there are few remaining realistic options for Rogers to purchase or affiliate with existing stations in the region. This had led Rogers to attempt, unsuccessfully, to request simultaneous substitution privileges for Citytv Toronto on its cable systems in New Brunswick and Newfoundland and Labrador. Prior to the CRTC's decision to refuse the request, Rogers had hinted that a similar agreement had been tentatively reached with EastLink, the main cable provider in Nova Scotia and Prince Edward Island.

Other such gaps include parts of the B.C. interior and Northern Ontario. However, like most Canadian networks, Citytv stations are generally available as distant signals on most cable and satellite providers nationwide.

In the past, local rights to individual Citytv programs were sold to stations outside of the Toronto station's coverage area. In Vancouver, programs were split between KVOS-TV in Bellingham, Washington, which is close to Vancouver, and CTV-owned CIVT-TV, during the 1990s and early 2000s when Citytv did not have a station in Vancouver; CHAN-TV, then a CTV affiliate, also aired some Citytv programs, such as CityLine. The WIC stations in Alberta (including CITV-TV and CICT-TV) bought provincial rights to some Citytv programs prior to the launch of CKAL and CKEM in 1997.

Affiliates and international franchises
The Citytv brand has been licensed to local television stations in Bogotá, Colombia and formerly in Barcelona, Spain. Toronto's CITY-DT is broadcast on a number of cable television providers in the Caribbean. In Barbados, Citytv is carried on channel 507 of the terrestrial subscription service known as Multi-Choice TV.

1 Italicized channel numbers indicate a digital channel allocated for future use by the Canadian Radio-television and Telecommunications Commission.

Former franchises

Citytv HD

In 2003, CHUM Limited launched a high definition simulcast of its Toronto station CITY-TV. In October 2006, Citytv installed a new control room, becoming one of the first fully HD broadcasters in Canada. On March 2, 2010, CKVU-TV in Vancouver launched its HD simulcast. CKEM-TV in Edmonton began testing its digital signal on May 26, 2010 and began regular HD broadcasts on June 29, 2010. CITY-DT-3 in Ottawa began testing its digital feed on June 12, 2010 and regular digital broadcasts on June 18, 2010. CKAL-TV began testing its high definition signal on August 31, 2010. By August 31, 2011, all Citytv owned-and-operated stations had their primary transmitters and most retransmitters broadcasting exclusively in digital.
 
Citytv HD is available nationally via satellite and on digital cable. It is also available for free over-the-air using a regular TV antenna and a digital tuner (included in most new television sets) via the following stations and retransmitters:

Video on demand and streaming services 
As with most Canadian networks, video on demand access to Citytv programming has been available in various forms, such as through TV provider set-top boxes and streaming through the network's website and mobile apps, since the early 2010s.

CitytvNow 
In June 2018, Rogers announced it would launch an expanded service called CitytvNow (stylized CitytvNOW) for authenticated customers of partnered TV service providers such as Rogers Cable. This added full-season, and in some cases past-season, availability of shows airing on Citytv; for a time, this also included exclusive programs not airing on the broadcast network.

Citytv+ 
On April 12, 2022, Rogers announced the launch of Citytv+ (pronounced Citytv Plus) as an add-on channel on Amazon's Prime Video platform, which includes most of the programming available on Citytv and sibling channel Omni Television as well as recent and selected past programming aired by the Canadian versions of FX and FXX, operating in a similar fashion to Corus Entertainment's StackTV.

Live linear feeds of most Citytv stations, as well as CityNews 24/7, a headline news channel similar to those offered online by Global News and an indirect successor to the CityNews Channel which operated from 2011 to 2013 (following the separation of Citytv and CP24 in 2009), also became available to Amazon Prime subscribers at no additional cost through Prime Video.

In popular culture 
 In the 1983 film Videodrome, a television station in Toronto which broadcasts sensationalistic programming is named CIVIC-TV; the name is in reference to flagship station CITY-TV. Additionally, a business partner of the station president in the film is named Moses, a possible reference to Citytv cofounder Moses Znaimer.

See also
 2007 Canada broadcast TV realignment
USA Broadcasting (which attempted a Citytv-inspired format dubbed "CityVision" on four of its owned stations from 1998 to 2001)

References

External links

Citytv+ official website
History of CITY-TV - Canadian Communications Foundation

 
Television channels and stations established in 1972
1972 establishments in Canada